"Break" is the lead single from Three Days Grace's third album, Life Starts Now. It was released on September 1, 2009, preceding Life Starts Now’s release by three weeks.

Release and chart performance
On August 31, 2009, the song made its North American radio debut on Ottawa, Ontario's CKQB-FM (Virgin Radio 106.9). The song became available in the iTunes Store on September 4, 2009.

In Billboard magazine, it charted at number 73 on the  Billboard Hot 100, number one on the Rock Songs chart, number one on the Mainstream Rock Tracks chart, number four on the Alternative Songs chart, and number 26 on the Canadian Hot 100. "Break" maintained a presence on the Billboard Rock Songs and Mainstream Rock Tracks charts for twelve and eleven weeks, respectively. Since this track's release, no subsequent Three Days Grace single has charted on the Billboard Hot 100.

As of February 21, 2010, the single has sold 359,461 units.

While being interviewed by the Peterborough Examiner, bass guitarist Brad Walst stated that "[the song] 'Break' is about breaking away from bad influences." Additionally, in an interview with TheDeadbolt.com, lead guitarist Barry Stock explained the meaning behind "Break":
 "It's really just about if you don't like the situation you're in or what's going on around you, it's entirely up to you to break out of it. That's it. It's pretty much just breaking out and letting loose. You don't have to be stuck in whatever it is you're dealing with. Whether it's good or bad, it's your choice to make a change."

Awards and nominations
In 2010, the song earned 2 nominations at the MuchMusic Video Awards for "Post Production of the Year" and "Rock Video of the Year". The song also earned a Casby Award nomination for "Best Single". The song was nominated for "Recording Engineer of the Year" at the
2011 Juno Awards. Billboard ranked the song at number 7 on their "Greatest of All Time Mainstream Rock Songs" list. It was the number one most played song on the Active Rock format in 2010.

Track listing
Promotional single
 "Break" – 3:13

Music video
On September 11, Three Days Grace announced the music video for "Break" would debut on Yahoo! Music on September 14, 2009.
The music video, directed by P. R. Brown, begins with the band members entering separate rooms that match their clothes' colors (Adam wearing white, Neil wearing black, Brad wearing gray, and Barry wearing pink), and shows four balls, matching the aforementioned colors, in a pendulum-like state. The beginning of the track "Someone Who Cares" serves as both the intro and the outro for the music video version of the song. The band begins to perform their parts in these separate rooms as giant fans appear and begin to operate. As the song progresses, floating paint balls are pulled through the fans and thus travel in a circle that leaves them stained with the color of the band mate to their left (Adam with pink, Neil with white, Brad with black, and Barry with gray). The song ends with them exiting down a hall, the four paint balls following them.

Several of the effects used in the video include: phantom cams, green screens, polymer, and water-based paint. Speaking about the music video, Brad Walst explained the concept of the video.

Personnel
Adam Gontier – lead vocals, rhythm guitar
Barry Stock – lead guitar
Brad Walst – bass guitar
Neil Sanderson – drums, backing vocals

Charts

Weekly charts

Year-end charts

All-time charts

Certifications

Accolades

References

External links

2009 songs
2009 singles
Three Days Grace songs
Songs written by Adam Gontier
Songs written by Barry Stock
Jive Records singles
Song recordings produced by Howard Benson